Akhs or AKHS may refer to:
Aghtsk, town in Armenia
Akh, ancient Egyptian concept of soul
Aga Khan Health Services (AKHS)
Ardrey Kell High School, located in Charlotte, North Carolina, United States